The Professional Footballers' Association Merit Award (often called the PFA Merit Award, or simply the Merit Award) is an award given by the Professional Footballers' Association (the PFA) for meritorious service to football.

The award was first given in 1974, and was won (jointly) by Bobby Charlton and Cliff Lloyd. The latest winner of the award is Gordon Taylor.

List of winners

1970s

1980s

1990s

2000s

2010s

2020s

Breakdown of winners

Winners by country

References

External links
The Official Website of the Professional Footballer's Association

English football trophies and awards
Awards established in 1974